John Wayne Delehant (September 3, 1890 – April 20, 1972) was a United States district judge of the United States District Court for the District of Nebraska.

Education and career

Born in Goodland, Kansas, Delehant received an Artium Baccalaureus degree from Creighton University in 1910, an Artium Magister degree from the same institution in 1911, and a Bachelor of Laws from Creighton University School of Law in 1913. He was in private practice in Beatrice, Nebraska from 1913 to 1942.

Federal judicial service

On January 19, 1942, Delehant was nominated by President Franklin D. Roosevelt to a seat on the United States District Court for the District of Nebraska vacated by Judge Thomas Charles Munger. Delehant was confirmed by the United States Senate on February 9, 1942, and received his commission on February 13, 1942. He served as Chief Judge from 1956 to 1957, assuming senior status on April 30, 1957. Delehant served in that capacity until his death on April 20, 1972, in Omaha, Nebraska.

References

Sources
 

1890 births
1972 deaths
Creighton University alumni
Judges of the United States District Court for the District of Nebraska
United States district court judges appointed by Franklin D. Roosevelt
20th-century American judges
People from Goodland, Kansas
People from Beatrice, Nebraska
Creighton University School of Law alumni